Haverhill is a market town and civil parish in the county of Suffolk, England, next to the borders of Essex and Cambridgeshire.

Geography
The town centre lies at the base of a gentle dip in the chalk hills of the Newmarket Ridge; running through the town is Stour Brook, which goes on to join the River Stour just outside the town. Rapid expansion of the town over the last two decades means that the western edge of Haverhill now includes the hamlet of Hanchet End. The surrounding countryside largely consists of arable land.

History

Haverhill dates back to at least Anglo-Saxon times, and the town's market is recorded in the Domesday Book (1086). Whilst most of its historical buildings were lost to the great fire on 14 June 1667, one notable Tudor-era house remains (reportedly given to Anne of Cleves as part of her divorce from Henry VIII and thus titled Anne of Cleves House although it was another vicarage not this one) as well as many interesting Victorian buildings.

Following a planning review in 1956, Haverhill was targeted for expansion. This was primarily to resettle communities from London which had been devastated during the Second World War. As part of this plan, new housing settlements and new factories were built. A later review in 1962 planned for a threefold increase in population from the then population of 5,446.

This influx of people changed many aspects of life in Haverhill. One noticeable change is that the local Suffolk accent (still spoken by the town's older residents) has largely been replaced by a London/South-east England accent characterised as Estuary English. The expansion was not without friction. Residents who moved to the newly developed areas complained about the housing density and lack of amenities in a 1968 Man Alive documentary.

Nowadays, Haverhill is predominantly a modern and young town. The relatively small town centre is surrounded by many large housing developments, completed at various periods between the 1950s and the present.

Economy
Haverhill's economy is dominated by industry, and a large industrial area on the southern side of the town is home to a large number of manufacturing companies. Scientific firms including Sanofi and Sigma-Aldrich have plants in the town, as do International Flavors & Fragrances, and some waste processing, transport and construction firms. A Research Park has also been built, which includes The EpiCentre innovation and conference centre alongside the bypass.

A weekly market is held on Fridays on the Market Square and on Saturday the market is on the High Street.

Sport and leisure

Haverhill has two Non-League football clubs, Haverhill Rovers F.C. and Haverhill Borough F.C., who both play in the Eastern Counties Football League. The two clubs share the New Croft ground. The town also has a tennis club which is affiliated with the Lawn Tennis Association. Other sporting clubs in the town include a cricket club, a rugby club, and an angling club. Since 2013 Haverhill has also been home to Suffolk's only baseball team, Haverhill Blackjacks, who play in the British Baseball Federation Single-A South league, and who also play their home games at the New Croft.

There are various sporting activities available in Haverhill, including a leisure centre (with swimming pool, gym and a children's soft play area, Kid City), an 18-hole golf course, a dance school, and a skate park.

Haverhill Arts Centre is housed within the grade II listed town hall, and features a cinema as well as hosting live music, drama, dance and comedy. A 5-screen multiplex cinema complex was opened in October 2008. From 2007 to 2013 the town was home to The Centre for Computing History, a computer museum established to tell the story of the Information Age.

West Suffolk Swimming Club formed in 1998 from the merger of two local swimming clubs. It operates from three pools located at the Bury St Edmunds Leisure Centre, Haverhill Leisure and Culford School.

Transport

Buses

Local bus services are provided by Stagecoach: routes 13, 13A, 13B and X13 run approximately every 30 minutes during the day, every 60 minutes evenings and Sundays. The bus station in Haverhill also provides local services to some of the surrounding towns and villages.

Road 
The A1307 road is the only major road that connects Haverhill to Cambridge; it also connects the town with the A11, A14 and the M11 motorway. This route experiences congestion with commuter traffic most mornings and evenings.
The A1307 is classified as a very high risk of casualty route. A proposal exists to develop the route whereby a new dual carriageway would be built from Haverhill to Cambridge, keeping the original road open as a feeder road and local bus stop route.

Railway 
The town no longer has a railway station; it is one of the largest towns in England, and the largest town in Suffolk, without one. It once had two railway stations and two interconnected railways. Both stations have since been demolished, but many bridges, cuttings and embankments are still visible in the Haverhill area. 

Rail Haverhill, formerly Cambridge to Sudbury Rail Renewal Association, is leading a campaign to re-open the railway between Haverhill and Cambridge; as of 2022, a feasibility study is underway.

Air 
The much smaller Cambridge City Airport also provides some domestic flights.

Culture
In 2000–01 two thousand inhabitants of Haverhill were photographed and morphed into a single image by the artist Chris Dorley-Brown. The resulting image was displayed in the National Portrait Gallery. This was the biggest photographic morphing project of its kind.

In November 2004, Haverhill made a claim for a world first, becoming the only known town to feature a laser-lit sculpture on a roundabout.

Schools
In Haverhill, there were two academies, Samuel Ward Trust (Samuel Ward, Clements, Coupals, Westfield And Churchill Special Free School) and Castle Partnership (Burton End Primary Academy, Place Farm Primary Academy and Castle Manor Academy). There is also an independent school known as Broadlands Hall School. These have now merged into the Samuel Ward Academy Trust, and subsequently into the Unity Schools Partnership with 14 other schools. St Felix Roman Catholic Church is part of the Our Lady of Walsingham Multi Academy Trust.

New Cangle is not an academy nor part of an academy.

Notable residents

Nathaniel Ward, the author of the first constitution in North America, was born in Haverhill in 1578. A local school is named after Nathaniel's brother Samuel. Pop musician Steve Rinaldi of the bands Rinaldi Sings and the Moment, who featured a map of the town on the cover of their first single, "In This Town" (1984), is originally from Haverhill.

Twin towns – sister cities
Haverhill is twinned with:
 Ehringshausen, Germany
 Pont-Saint-Esprit, France

Gallery
The following photographs were taken in May 2015.

Freedom of the Town
The following people and military units have received the Freedom of the Town of Haverhill.

Individuals
 Mr. Brian E. "Taffy" Thomas: 2009.  
 Herr Martin Neuhof: 30 March 2018.
 Mr Rodney M. Swaby

Military Units
 The Royal Anglian Regiment: 18 June 2019.

References

External links
Haverhill-UK
The History of Haverhill in the 20th century

 
Market towns in Suffolk
Towns in Suffolk
Civil parishes in Suffolk
Borough of St Edmundsbury